Walther Kurt von Seydlitz-Kurzbach (22 August 1888 – 28 April 1976) was a German general during World War II who commanded the LI Army Corps during the Battle of Stalingrad. At the end of the battle, he gave his officers freedom of action and was relieved of command. He assisted the Soviet Union as a prisoner-of-war. After the war, he was convicted by the Soviets of war crimes. In 1996, he was posthumously pardoned by Russia.

Life
Seydlitz-Kurzbach was born in Hamburg, Germany, into the noble Prussian Seydlitz family. During World War I, he served on both fronts as an officer. During the Weimar Republic, he remained a professional officer in the Reichswehr. From 1940 to 1942, he commanded the 12th Infantry Division of the German Army. When the division was encircled in the Demyansk Pocket, Seydlitz was responsible for breaking the Soviet cordon and enabling German units to escape from encirclement. For this action, he was promoted to General of the Artillery and appointed commander of the LI Corps.

The corps was subordinated to the Sixth Army during the Battle of Stalingrad. When the entire army was trapped in the city in the course of the Soviet Operation Uranus, Seydlitz was one of the generals who argued most forcefully in favour of a breakout or a surrender, against Hitler’s orders. On 25 January 1943, he told his subordinate officers that they were free to decide for themselves on whether to surrender. Friedrich Paulus immediately relieved him of command of his three divisions (the 100th, 71st and 295th Infantry Divisions).

A few days later, Seydlitz fled the German lines under fire from his own side with a group of other officers. He was taken into Soviet custody, where he was interrogated by Captain Nikolay Dyatlenko.

He was identified by his interrogators as a potential collaborator. In August 1943 he was taken with two other generals to a political re-education centre at Lunovo. A month later he was sent back to prisoner-of-war camps to recruit other German officers.

Seydlitz was a leader in the forming, under Soviet supervision, of an anti-Nazi organisation, the League of German Officers, and was made a member of the National Committee for a Free Germany. He was condemned by many of his fellow generals for his collaboration with the Soviet Union. He was sentenced to death in absentia by Hitler's government. Seydlitz's idea of creating an anti-Nazi force of some 40,000 German prisoners-of-war to be airlifted into Germany was never seriously considered. In Germany, his family was taken into Sippenhaft, detention for the crimes of a family member. Seydlitz was ultimately exploited by both Soviet and German propaganda. He was used by the former in broadcasts and literature to encourage German soldiers to surrender, and the latter cultivated the idea of "Seydlitz troops".

In 1949, he was charged with war crimes. He was put on trial for responsibility for actions against Soviet POWs and the civilian population while in Wehrmacht service. In 1950, a Soviet tribunal sentenced him to 25 years of imprisonment, but in 1955 he was released to West Germany, where in 1956, his Third Reich death sentence was nullified. However, he was despised by his former army colleagues both for his role in the Battle of Stalingrad and for his later collaboration with the Soviet Union. He was denied the restoration of his retired rank and pension by the Bundeswehr.

Seydlitz died on 28 April 1976 in Bremen. On 23 April 1996, a posthumous pardon was issued by the Russian authorities.

Awards
 Iron Cross (1914) 2nd Class (19 September 1914) & 1st Class (21 October 1915)

 Clasp to the Iron Cross (1939) 2nd Class (17 May 1940) & 1st Class (22 May 1940)
 Knight's Cross of the Iron Cross with Oak Leaves
 Knight's Cross on 15 August 1940 as Generalmajor and commander of 12. Infanterie-Division
 Oak Leaves on 31 December 1941 as Generalmajor and commander of 12. Infanterie-Division

References

Citations

Works cited

External links
 
 

1888 births
1976 deaths
German Army generals of World War II
Generals of Artillery (Wehrmacht)
German Army personnel of World War I
German commanders at the Battle of Stalingrad
German prisoners of war in World War II held by the Soviet Union
Recipients of the Knight's Cross of the Iron Cross with Oak Leaves
Recipients of the clasp to the Iron Cross, 1st class
National Committee for a Free Germany members
People sentenced to death in absentia
Recipients of Russian presidential pardons
People who have received posthumous pardons
People from Hamburg-Nord
Military personnel from Hamburg